Alopoglossus buckleyi, also known commonly as Buckley's shade lizard and Buckley's teiid, is a species of lizard in the family Alopoglossidae. The species is native to northwestern South America.

Etymology
The specific name, buckleyi, is in honor of Clarence Buckley (1839–1889) who collected the holotype.

Geographic range
A. buckleyi is found in Brazil (Amazonas, Acre), Colombia (Amazonas), eastern Ecuador, and eastern Peru (Loreto).

Habitat

Description
A. buckleyi is a small species of lizard.

Reproduction
A. buckleyi is oviparous.

References

Further reading
Boulenger GA (1885). Catalogue of the Lizards in the British Museum (Natural History). Second Edition. Volume II. ... Teiidæ ... London: Trustees of the British Museum (Natural History). (Taylor and Francis, printers). xiii + 497 pp. + Plates I-XXIV. (Alopoglossus buckleyi, new combination, p. 385).
Köhler G, Diethert H-H, Veselý M (2012). "A Contribution to the Knowledge of the Lizard Genus Alopoglossus (Squamata: Gymnophthalmidae)". Herpetological Monographs 26 (1): 173–188. (in English, with an abstract in Spanish).
O'Shaughnessy AWE (1881). "An Account of the Collection of Lizards made by Mr. Buckley in Ecuador, and now in the British Museum, with Descriptions of the new Species". Proceedings of the Zoological Society of London 1881: 227-245 + Plates XXII-XXV. (Leposoma buckleyi, new species, pp. 233-235 + Plate XXII, figures 2, 2a, 2b).
Ribeiro-Júnior MA, Amaral S (2017). "Catalogue of distribution of lizards (Reptilia: Squamata) from the Brazilian Amazonia. 4. Alopoglossidae, Gymnophthalmidae". Zootaxa 4269 (2): 151–196.

Alopoglossus
Reptiles described in 1881
Taxa named by Arthur William Edgar O'Shaughnessy